The Zayeltsovskoye Cemetery is a cemetery in the Zayeltsovsky City District of Novosibirsk, Russia. The area of the graveyard is about 200 hectares.

Notable people buried at the Zayeltsovskoye Cemetery

 Varvara Bulgakova, sister of famous Russian writer Mikhail Bulgakov
 Albert Chernenko, Russian philosopher, son of Konstantin Chernenko
 Yanka Dyagileva, Russian poet, singer-songwriter and punk rock singer
 Yuri Korshunov, Russian entomologist, scientific worker of the Zoological Museum in the Institute of Systematics and Ecology of Animals
 Ivan Sollertinsky, Russian polymath of the Soviet period
 Nikolai Tikhomirov, Russian engineer, public figure, one of the founders of Novosibirsk

External links
 Вишенка для Янки. Сиб.фм 
 Сколько стоит умереть?. Сиб.фм 
 Заельцовское кладбище. 
 
 

 
Cemeteries in Novosibirsk
Zayeltsovsky City District, Novosibirsk